This article lists the results for the Japan national football team between 1970 and 1979.

1970

1971

1972

1973

1974

1975

1976

1977

1978

1979

References 

Japan national football team results
1970s in Japanese sport